Justin Gimelstob and Daniel Vacek were the defending champions, but did not participate this year.

Jonas Björkman and David Prinosil won the title, defeating Jiří Novák and David Rikl 6–2, 6–3 in the final.

Seeds

Draw

Draw

External links
Draw

Kremlin Cup
Kremlin Cup